Ulverscroft is a   nature reserve north of Markfield in Leicestershire, England. It is managed by the Leicestershire and Rutland Wildlife Trust (LRWT) and part of it is owned by the National Trust and part by the LRWT. The site is partly in Ulverscroft Valley, which is a Site of Special Scientific Interest.

The site has diverse habitats with woodland, heath, wet grassland, a pond, a meadow, marshes and sphagnum bog. The meadow has a rich flora, including fragrant orchid, devil's-bit scabious and bitter vetch.

There is access from Whitcrofts Lane.

References

Leicestershire and Rutland Wildlife Trust